Obergurig (German) or Hornja Hórka (Upper Sorbian) is a municipality in the district of Bautzen, in Saxony, Germany.

The municipality is part of the recognized Sorbian settlement area in Saxony. Upper Sorbian has an official status next to German, all villages bear names in both languages.

The villages of Singwitz (Sorbian: Dźěžnikecy), Mönchswalde (Mnišonc), Lehn (Lejno), Schwarznaußlitz (Čorne Noslicy), Großdöbschütz (Debsecy) and Kleindöbschütz (Małe Debsecy) belong to the municipality.

References 

Municipalities in Saxony
Populated places in Bautzen (district)